The 2003 college football season may refer to:

 2003 NCAA Division I-A football season
 2003 NCAA Division I-AA football season
 2003 NCAA Division II football season
 2003 NCAA Division III football season
 2003 NAIA Football National Championship